No Secrets is an upcoming South Korean television series starring Go Kyung-pyo and Kang Han-na. It is scheduled to premiere on JTBC in the second half of 2023.

Synopsis
No Secrets tells the melodrama story of Song Ki-baek (Go Kyung-pyo), an announcer with 33 years of experience working for Ultra FM who develop a disorder that causes him to speak without thinking, and On Woo-joo (Kang Han-na), a variety show's writer who is willing to do anything for an entertaining program. Song's speaking action causes by his disorder catches the attention of On who finds it interesting and decided to appeared with him in a love variety show.

Cast

Main
 Go Kyung-pyo as Song Ki-baek
 Kang Han-na as On Woo-joo

References

External links 
 
 

JTBC television dramas
Korean-language television shows
Television series by KeyEast
South Korean comedy television series
South Korean melodrama television series
2023 South Korean television series debuts